Betika is a sports betting platform with operations in Kenya, Tanzania, Ethiopia, DRC, Ghana, Nigeria, Mozambique, Zambia and Malawi. Betika has a number of products including Sportsbook Betting, Casino, Virtual Games and E-Sports Betting Betika has set the minimum bet at only Kshs 1. The coupon winnings cannot exceed Kshs 500,000.

Ownership 
Betika, is owned by Shop and Deliver Limited a company with Kenyan shareholders.

Sports involvement 
Betika is the current sponsor for AFC Leopards and Kenya Police Football Clubs.

Betika has invested in promotion of the sporting culture and talent development among the youth through its initiative dubbed Betika Na Community. The initiative provides support to grassroot sports by providing kits, sports equipment and financial support to local teams in Kenya. The company through the Betika Na Community initiative has also facilitated professional sports tournaments in different counties and aims to reach all the 47 counties in the country. Local artists are given a platform to showcase their talents during the tournaments, giving them some income and exposure that they need to grow.

References 

Visit site: รีวิวเว็บพนันบอลดีที่สุด

Online gambling companies of Kenya